Naburot Island (Locally known as Isla Naburot) is an island located in Brgy. Sinapsapan, Jordan, Guimaras in the Philippines. The island can be also seen from Alubihod Beach resort in Nueva Valencia, Guimaras.

References 

Islands of Guimaras